The Waalseilandsgracht, or Waalseilandgracht, is a short, wide canal in the east part of the inner city of Amsterdam.

Location

The Waalseilandsgracht runs between the Oosterdok (originally part of the IJ) at the Scheepvaarthuis and the Oudeschans at the Montelbaanstoren.
Three bridges cross the Waalseilandsgracht: 
 Prins Hendrikkade crosses at the Oosterdok de Kraansluis (bridge no. 300), 
 The monumental Waalseiland bridge (bridge no. 283) crosses the middle
 At the Montelbaan tower along the Oudeschans it is crossed by the Montelbaans bridge (bridge no. 280).
The streets along the water on the west and south side (Lastagebuurt) are called Kromme Waal and Oude Waal.
On the northeast side (on the Waalseiland): Binnenkant.

History

The canal is named after the Waalseiland to the northeast of it, which was created by infill in 1644. 
The Waalseilandsgracht was part of the Port of Amsterdam until the 19th century .

See also 
Canals of Amsterdam

Notes

Canals in Amsterdam